Żyrardów railway station is a railway station in Żyrardów, Poland.  The station is served by Koleje Mazowieckie (who run trains from Skierniewice to Warszawa Wschodnia), PKP Intercity (TLK services), and Przewozy Regionalne (InterRegio services). It was opened in 1845 as part of the Warsaw–Vienna railway.

Train services
The station is served by the following service(s):

 Intercity services (IC) Łódź Fabryczna — Warszawa Główna/Warszawa Wschodnia
 Intercity services (IC) Łódź Fabryczna — Warszawa — Lublin Główny
 Intercity services (IC) Łódź Fabryczna — Warszawa — Gdańsk Glowny — Kołobrzeg Intercity services (IC) Bydgoszcz Główna — Warszawa GłównaIntercity services (IC) Wrocław- Opole - Częstochowa - WarszawaKoleo. PKP IC 6124 FREDRO Wrocław Główny — Warszawa Wschodnia. Timetable. https://koleo.pl/pociag/IC/6124-FREDRO/
 Intercity services (IC) Wrocław - Ostrów Wielkopolski - Łódź - Warszawa Intercity services (IC) Zgorzelec - Legnica - Wrocław - Ostrów Wielkopolski - Łódź - WarszawaIntercity services (IC) Białystok - Warszawa - Częstochowa - Opole - WrocławIntercity services (IC) Białystok - Warszawa - Łódź - Ostrów Wielkopolski - WrocławIntercity services (IC) Ełk - Białystok - Warszawa - Łódź - Ostrów Wielkopolski - WrocławIntercity services (IC) Warszawa - Częstochowa - Katowice - Bielsko-BiałaIntercity services (IC) Białystok - Warszawa - Częstochowa - Katowice - Bielsko-Biała Intercity services (IC) Kołobrzeg - Piła - Bydgoszcz - Warszawa - Lublin - Hrubieszów 
Intercity services (IC) Olsztyn - Warszawa - Skierniewice - ŁódźIntercity services (IC) Olsztyn - Warszawa - Skierniewice - Częstochowa - Katowice - Bielsko-BiałaIntercity services (IC) Olsztyn - Warszawa - Skierniewice - Częstochowa - Katowice - Gliwice - RacibórzIntercity services (TLK) Warszawa - Częstochowa - Lubliniec - Opole - Wrocław - Szklarska Poręba GórnaIntercity services (TLK) Gdynia Główna — Zakopane Koleo. PKP TLK 53104 MAŁOPOLSKA Gdynia Główna — Zakopane. Timetable. https://koleo.pl/en/pociag/TLK/53104-MA%C5%81OPOLSKA
 InterRegio services (IR) Łódź Fabryczna — Warszawa Glowna 
 InterRegio services (IR) Łódź Kaliska — Warszawa Glowna 
 InterRegio services (IR) Ostrów Wielkopolski — Łódź — Warszawa Główna InterRegio services (IR) Poznań Główny — Ostrów Wielkopolski — Łódź — Warszawa Główna''

References

Station article at kolej.one.pl

Railway stations in Poland opened in 1845
Railway stations in Masovian Voivodeship
Railway stations served by Koleje Mazowieckie
Żyrardów County
Railway stations served by Przewozy Regionalne InterRegio